Laterza is an Italian surname. Notable people with the surname include:

Jerry Laterza (born 1974), Paraguayan American soccer player
Marco Laterza, Swiss fitness model and bodybuilder
Tom Laterza (born 1992), Luxembourgish footballer
Tony Laterza, American basketball coach

Italian-language surnames